John Harland (born c. 1870) was an English professional golfer. Harland tied for seventh place in the 1895 U.S. Open, held on Friday, October 4, at Newport Golf Club in Newport, Rhode Island. Horace Rawlins won the inaugural U.S. Open title, two strokes ahead of runner-up Willie Dunn. Harland had five top-40 finishes in the U.S. Open.

Early life
Harland was born in England, circa 1870.

Golf career
Harland posted rounds of 93-90=183 and tied for seventh place in the 1895 U.S. Open, held on Friday, October 4, at Newport Golf Club in Newport, Rhode Island. Horace Rawlins won the inaugural U.S. Open title, two strokes ahead of runner-up Willie Dunn. Harland was the professional and green keeper at the Weston Golf Club in Weston, Massachusetts.

Results in major championships

Note: Harland played only in the U.S. Open.

"T" indicates a tie for a place
Yellow background for top-10
? = Unknown
DNP = Did not play

Death and legacy
Harland's date of death is unknown. He is best remembered as a frequent competitor in the U.S. Open in the late 19th and early 20th century.

References

English male golfers
English emigrants to the United States